Stan Thomas Graham (29 January 1926 – 30 September 2010) was a Progressive Conservative party member of the House of Commons of Canada. Born in Northern Ireland, he had a career as a businessman.

He was elected at the Kootenay East—Revelstoke electoral district in the 1979 federal election, but was defeated in the 1980 election by Sid Parker of the New Democratic Party. Graham returned to national politics when he won back the riding in 1984 federal election, but again lost his seat in the 1988 election after a defeat in Kootenay East to Parker. Graham did not campaign for further terms in Parliament. He died in 2010.

External links

 

1926 births
2010 deaths
Members of the House of Commons of Canada from British Columbia
Progressive Conservative Party of Canada MPs